Railroad Avenue Historic District may refer to:

in the United States
(by state)
Railroad Avenue Historic District (Opelika, Alabama), listed on the NRHP in Lee County, Alabama
Railroad Avenue Historic District (Willcox, Arizona), listed on the NRHP in Cochise County, Arizona
Railroad Avenue Industrial District, Bridgeport, CT, listed on the NRHP in Bridgeport, Connecticut
Railroad Avenue Historic District (Las Vegas, New Mexico), listed on the NRHP in San Miguel County, New Mexico